Zeinab Mohammed Salih (Arabic: زينب محمد صالح‎, born in Khartoum, Sudan) is a Sudanese freelance journalist, working mainly on political, social and gender-related issues in Sudan and neighbouring countries. She has published numerous reports for national Sudanese as well as for international news media, such as The Guardian, The Independent, BBC News, Financial Times and Al Jazeera.

Biography 
Salih earned an MA degree in international politics from City, University of London and in international journalism from Cardiff University in the United Kingdom. Ahead of the Sudanese presidential 2010 elections and the 2011 referendum on southern Sudanese self-determination, Salih joined The Niles project in 2009, a German government funded transnational newspaper, published in Arabic and English. She was one of a group of young freelance journalists from norther and southern Sudan who acquired professional training to report about current and cultural affairs. In 2017, she also worked as journalist at the United Nations Headquarters in New York City.

Among Salih's more than 100 articles published by The Guardian up to March 2022, there are several reports about the Sudanese Revolution, and she has written about pro-democracy activists, atrocities committed by the Sudanese military or security forces, the role of women in the Sudanese revolution, rape and lack of justice after the killing of a teenage girl. In a 2019 article for the BBC News published before the revolution, she reported about Sudanese women using a Facebook group to share photographs of as yet unidentified sexual perpetrators, where the members of the group then tried to identify and denounce them publicly. Among other issues, Salih has also written on Al-Jazeera News about ongoing human rights violations in Sudan's Darfur region, and BBC about racial abuse and glorification of past slave traders in Sudan.

Salih founded the Sudanese Network for Human Rights Information and has also reported on political and human rights issues in neighbouring Egypt, Chad and Ethiopia. In the 2019 book Pioneers, Rebels and a few Villains. 150 years of journalism in Eastern Africa, she was described as a "tireless freelance reporter about and beyond the Sudanese Revolution."

References

Further reading 

  pdf

External links 

 Zeinab Mohammed Salih on Twitter
 Mention of Zeinab Mohammed Salih on Google books

Sudanese journalists
Living people
Sudanese mass media people
Year of birth unknown
Alumni of City, University of London
Alumni of Cardiff University
Sudanese women journalists
Year of birth missing (living people)